Hugh Scott  (1885–1960) was a British entomologist and biogeographer. He became a Fellow of the Royal Society in 1941. He worked as curator of the Cambridge University Museum of Zoology and as assistant keeper in the Department of Entomology, British Museum (Natural History).

He was a close friend and coworker of G. Evelyn Hutchinson.

Taxa named after him include:
 Eunidia scotti 
 Niphoparmena scotti 
 Hugoscottia  (A subgenus of Enochrus)

References

General references

External links

 
 

1885 births
1960 deaths
Fellows of the Royal Society
British entomologists
Alumni of Trinity College, Cambridge
Employees of the Natural History Museum, London
Academics of the University of Cambridge
20th-century British zoologists